Ilunga is a relatively common personal name in the Democratic Republic of the Congo.

The name ILUNGA derives from the verb "kulunga", which means to unite, unify, gather or put together. ILUNGA is the name that the BALUBA give to those they consider to be unifying or bringing people together. "Kulunga" opposes the verb "kusansanya", which means to separate or to divide.

In June 2004, "ilunga" was reported as being a Bantu word meaning "a person who is ready to forgive any abuse for the first time, to tolerate it a second time, but never a third time", and – in the opinion of 1,000 linguists surveyed on the subject – the world's most difficult word to translate.

Ilunga as a family name
Ilunga is a family name placed before the given name. There are many famous African and African-descended people named Ilunga. For example:

 Kalala Ilunga, legendary founder of the Luba ethnic group of Democratic Republic of Congo
Sylvestre Ilunga, appointed as the Prime Minister of the Democratic Republic of the Congo in May 2019-
 Bendele Ilunga, boxer, Belgium
 Didier Ilunga-Mbenga, basketball, Congo, joined Dallas Mavericks in July 2004
 Dorah Ilunga Kabulu, politician, Belgium
 Enock Ilunga, painter, Zambia
 Hérita Ilunga, footballer, Democratic Republic of Congo
 Ferousi Ilunga, boxer, Congo
 Ilunga A. Kalonzo Ilunga, politician, Congo
 Ilunga Katele, traditional culture hero, royal ancestor of the Chokwe people
 Martin-Léonard Bakole wa Ilunga (deceased), Catholic archbishop, Congo
 Masengo Ilunga, former footballer of Ethnikos Piraeus born in Zaire.
 Gen. Ilunga Shamanga (deceased), Congo, Army General, last interior minister of Mobutu's regime, and later prominent member of the Congolese Rally for Democracy rebel group.
 Ilunga Mwepu, Congolese footballer
 Kasongo Ilunga, Congolese politician

Tshiluba is a language spoken in southeastern Democratic Republic of the Congo.

See also
 Words hardest to translate

References

 MacIntyre, Ben. Why do Koreans say "a biscuit would be nice" instead of "I want a biscuit"?, The Times, August 21, 2004.

Given names
Bantu-language surnames
Kongo-language surnames